Samuel Nicholas Huff (born January 14, 1998) is an American professional baseball catcher for the Texas Rangers of Major League Baseball (MLB). He made his MLB debut in 2020.

Amateur career
Huff attended Arcadia High School in Phoenix, Arizona. He was drafted by the Texas Rangers in the seventh round, with the 219th overall selection, of the 2016 Major League Baseball draft. He signed with the Rangers for a $225,000 signing bonus, forgoing a commitment to Grand Canyon University.

Professional career
Huff spent his first two professional seasons with the Arizona League Rangers of the Rookie-level Arizona League, hitting .330/.436/.485/.921 with 1 home run and 17 RBI in 2016, and .249/.329/.452/.781 with 9 home runs and 31 RBI in 2017. He played the 2018 season with the Hickory Crawdads of the Class A South Atlantic League, hitting .241/.292/.439/.731 with 18 home runs and 55 RBI. He opened 2019 back with Hickory, hitting .333/.368/.796/1.164 with 15 home runs and 29 RBI over 30 games. He was promoted to the Down East Wood Ducks of the Class A-Advanced Carolina League on May 9. Huff was named to the 2019 All-Star Futures Game. Huff hit a two-run home run off of Ben Bowden in the seventh inning to tie the game, and was awarded the 2019 Futures Game Larry Doby Most Valuable Player award. Huff has named a 2019 Carolina League Year-End All-Star. Huff produced a .262/.326/.425/.751 slash line with 13 home runs and 43 RBI for Down East.

On September 10, 2020, the Rangers selected Huff's contract and promoted him to the major leagues. He made his major league debut the next day against the Oakland Athletics. In 10 games for Texas in 2020, Huff hit .355/.394/.742/1.136 with 3 home runs and 4 RBI.

On April 23, 2021, it was announced that Huff would undergo surgery on April 28 to remove a "loose body" from his right knee, requiring eight weeks of recovery. On May 4, Huff was placed on the 60-day injured list as he recovered from the surgery. On July 17, Huff was activated off of the injured list.

Huff played 46 games in Double-A with the Frisco RoughRiders prior to being promoted to Triple-A Round Rock on September 23, 2021. In Frisco he hit an average of .237 with 10 home runs and 23 runs batted in. Following the 2021 season, Huff played for the Surprise Saguaros of the Arizona Fall League. Huff split the 2022 season between Texas and Round Rock. With Texas he hit 240/.303/.372/.675 with 4 home runs and 10 RBI over 44 games; with Round Rock Huff hit .260/.336/.533/.868 with 21 home runs and 50 RBI over 63 games played.

References

External links

1998 births
Living people
Baseball players from Phoenix, Arizona
Major League Baseball catchers
Texas Rangers players
Arizona League Rangers players
Arizona Complex League Rangers players
Hickory Crawdads players
Down East Wood Ducks players
Frisco RoughRiders players
Round Rock Express players
Surprise Saguaros players